There is a high crime rate in all regions of Kenya. Petty offences are the most common crime with stealing being the most reported crime. Robbery and theft are among the least cited criminal offences. Crime in Kenya is as low as in countries like Tunisia with a rating of 3.46 crimes per 100,000 people. However, it is important to note that crime in Kenya often goes unreported and police often lack the training or experience to effectively respond to crimes. Despite the reportedly somewhat low crime rate, Kenya has a big problem with organized crime and many gangs work with corrupt police officers and sometimes even the government. Kenya has a criminality score of 6.95 on the Organized Crime Index, the 11th most in the world. 

Homicide rates in Kenya are Lower than the United States rates

In general, crime rates in Kenya are much lower outside of Nairobi. Kenya is generally safe for tourists as long as they follow their country's travel advisory, but robbery of tourists does take place. There is a special police unit that deals with mitigating tourist target offences which lead to a decline in such offences.

Crime by type

Carjacking
The most common crime in Kenya is carjacking to commit an armed robbery. In early 2007, two US citizens were killed and one was critically injured in two separate carjacking incidents. Nairobi averages about ten vehicle hijackings per day, while Kenyan authorities have limited capacity to deter or investigate such acts. Matatus (public transportation) tend to be targeted since they carry up to 14 passengers.

Although these attacks are often violent, victims are generally not injured if they do not resist. However, victims are sometimes tied up and put in the back seat or trunk of their own car. Criminals who commit these crimes will not hesitate to shoot a victim who is the least bit uncooperative or who may appear to hesitate before complying with their assailant.

Theft and banditry
Pickpockets and thieves carry out "snatch and run" crimes on city streets and near crowds. There have been reports of safes being stolen from hotel rooms and hotel desk staff being forced to open safes.

Thieves routinely snatch jewellery and other objects from open vehicle windows while motorists are either stopped at traffic lights or in heavy traffic. Thieves on matatus, buses and trains may steal valuables from inattentive passengers. Many scams, perpetrated against unsuspecting tourists, are prevalent in and around the city of Nairobi. Many of these involve people impersonating police officers and using fake police ID badges as well as other credentials. Nevertheless, police checkpoints are common in Kenya and all vehicles are required to stop if directed to do so.

There has been an increase in armed banditry in or near many of Kenya's national parks and game reserves, particularly the Samburu, Leshaba and Masai Mara game reserves. In response, the Kenya Wildlife Service and police have taken some steps to strengthen security in the affected areas, but the problem has not been eliminated. Travelers who do not use the services of reputable travel firms or knowledgeable guides or drivers are especially at risk.

Although sometimes confused with the similarly named North Rift Valley region, where cattle rustling and banditry is common, the separate North Eastern Province has been relatively peaceful since the appointment of its former Provincial Commissioner, Mohamoud Saleh. During his time in office, Saleh established an effective security committee consisting of clan elders and leaders, and worked closely with community members to assure security. Owing to the success of this "Saleh Strategy", the Garissa Peace and Development Committee (GPDC) in 2010 hosted several high-level delegations from adjacent nations such as Uganda, and shared its experiences in community building. According to Interpol, the NEP's commercial hub of Garissa is also one of the safest areas in the larger eastern Great Lakes region.

Ethnic violence 

Kenya is generally a peaceful and friendly country in its political activism, it is nonetheless common during elections, referendums and other political votes for campaign violence to occur around the country, and ethnic clashes account for much of Kenya's problems. An early example of this was during the 1970s, when tribal clashes killed thousands and left tens of thousands homeless, which allowed Daniel arap Moi to be re-elected in balloting, according to the United Nations Office on Drugs and Crime, "marred by violence and fraud."

After 29 December 2007, the day after Kenya's National Parliamentary and presidential elections, violence erupted in major cities cross Kenya, including Nairobi, Mombasa, and Kisumu. Clashes were reported throughout Kenya, which resulted in the deaths of over 600 Kenyans. None of these incidents was targeted against the expatriate community.

Corruption 

In the Corruption Perceptions Index 2007, Kenya was ranked 150th out of 179 countries for corruption (least corrupt countries are at the top of the list). In 2007, on a scale of 0 to 10, with 0 the most corrupt and 10 the most transparent, Transparency International rated Kenya 2.1.

In 2006, it was estimated the average urban Kenyan pays 16 bribes per month. Most of these bribes are fairly small but large ones are also taken – bribes worth over KSh.50,000/= (€600, US$700) account for 41% of the total value. There is also corruption on a larger scale with each of the last two government regimes being criticised for their involvement.

The Kenyan Prison Service was not established until 1911 under the Ministry of Home Affairs, Heritage and Sports. Then in 1917, it was decided to name people to the jobs of Commissioner of Prisons and Assistant Commissioner of prisons. This now caused the responsibility and managing of prisons to be solely controlled by the commissioner. The current head of prison administration in Kenya is Isaiah Samuel Osugo and he oversees all 108 prisons/institutions that are located in Kenya. Throughout the history of Kenya, there has been a long running tab of corruption and violence that has taken place in the country. Kenya has never been a very safe country because of many issues within its political system and they are still having many issues to this day. One fact worth noting is that, "According to the EACC, at least 30% of GDP, which is the equivalent to about $6 Billion in the United States, is being lost to corruption." (Amnesty International) Their government has also been accused of corruption because of inflating costs in procurement processes. Kenya has many problems with armed groups. For example, on 25 October 2016, 12 people were killed in the town of Mandera by Al-Shabaab on a guest house that hosting a theatre group. It is hard for Kenya to put a stop to groups like this when their security agencies are also corrupt. According to Amnesty International, "Security agencies were implicated in human rights violations, including extrajudicial executions, enforced disappearances and torture" (Amnesty International). There is supposed to be freedom of speech and expression in Kenya, but the authorities continue take away the freedom of expression by trying to intimidate journalists, bloggers, and other influential members of civil society.<Amnesty International. (n.d.). Retrieved 6 October 2017, from https://www.amnesty.org/en/countries/africa/kenya/report-kenya>

Terrorism

Several persons (possibly tied to al-Qaeda) suspected of involvement with the 1998 East Africa Embassy attacks and the 2002 Kikambala attacks in Mombasa remain at large and potentially dangerous to tourists and Kenyans.

At the urging of the Al-Shabaab militant group, a significant and increasing number of terrorist attacks in Kenya have been carried out by local Kenyans, many of whom are recent converts to Islam. Estimates in 2012 placed the figure of Kenyan fighters at around 10% of Al-Shabaab's total forces.

Referred to as the "Kenyan Mujahideen" by Al-Shabaab's core members, the converts are typically young and overzealous, poverty making them easier targets for the outfit's recruitment activities. Because the Kenyan insurgents have a different profile from the Somali and Arab militants that allows them to blend in with the general population of Kenya, they are also often harder to track. Reports suggest that Al-Shabaab is attempting to build an even more multi-ethnic generation of fighters in the larger region.

One such recent convert who helped mastermind the Kampala bombings but now cooperates with the Kenyan police believes that in doing so, the group is essentially trying to use local Kenyans to do its "dirty work" for it while its core members escape unscathed. According to diplomats, Muslim areas in coastal Kenya and Tanzania, such as Mombasa and Zanzibar, are also especially vulnerable for recruitment.

Drug abuse
Drug abuse has become a major issue in Kenya, especially in Mombasa which is affected by this issue more than any other part of the country. Young men in their early 20s have been the most affected demographic. Women in Mombasa have held public protests, asking the government to move quickly to arrest young people using narcotics.

In Mombasa and Kilindini, there are approximately 40 maskani (meaning "places" in Swahili) where drug abusers meet to share drugs. Bhang smoking has until recently been the drug of choice, but heroin injection is becoming increasingly popular. 70 percent of drug abusers have admitted that they are using heroin.

In addition to drug abuse, the trafficking of illegal drugs in the country has become a major issue as well. An estimated US$100 million worth is trafficked within the country each year.

Poaching

See also
Cattle raiding in Kenya
Mungiki

References